The Holmes–Tallman House is a large farmhouse with Carpenter's Italianate style located northwest of Jamesburg, at the corner of County Route 535 (Cranbury-South River Road)  and County Route 522 (Rhode Hall Road, formerly Brown's Corner Road), in Monroe Township, Middlesex County, New Jersey. Also known as Brown's Corner House, it was added to the National Register of Historic Places on September 12, 1979, for its significance in architecture.

History and description
The house was built  by Francis Holmes. It was then purchased by Jacob B. Tallman in 1870. Built of wood, it features a three-story cubical main section with a two-story wing in the back. A one-story porch with eyelet jigsaw work spans the front and sides. The hip roof has a square cupola.

See also
 National Register of Historic Places listings in Middlesex County, New Jersey

References

Monroe Township, Middlesex County, New Jersey		
National Register of Historic Places in Middlesex County, New Jersey
Houses on the National Register of Historic Places in New Jersey
Houses in Middlesex County, New Jersey
Italianate architecture in New Jersey
1860 establishments in New Jersey
Houses completed in 1860
New Jersey Register of Historic Places